Esrum Abbey, also Esrom Abbey ( or ), was the second  Cistercian monastery founded in Denmark, located near Hillerød in Region Hovedstaden, on the island of Zealand (Sjælland), on the north side of the Esrum Sø (Lake Esrum) near Esbønderup and Græsted.

History

Monastery 
Esrum Abbey began as a Benedictine foundation, perhaps in about 1140, and was built near a pre-Christian religious site, later called Esrum Spring, where a small wooden stave chapel may have existed before the abbey was established. The foundation was taken over by the Cistercians in 1151 on the authority of Archbishop Eskil of Lund, and was counted as a daughter house of Clairvaux. 

Esrum in its turn became in the course of time the mother house of a number of other important Cistercian foundations: Vitskøl Abbey and Sorø Abbey in Denmark; Ryd Abbey, now in Schleswig-Holstein; and Kołbacz Abbey near Szczecin. Monks from Esrum also founded Dargun Abbey in Mecklenburg in 1172, but abandoned it after hostile military action in 1198, and the later history of Dargun rests on its re-foundation in 1208 from Doberan Abbey. The former community from Dargun went on however to found Eldena Abbey. Esrum Abbey burned down in 1194 and again in 1204, resulting in the construction of a new church – a three-aisled basilica with transepts and a rectangular choir – and monastery built out of red brick, the most common building material of the time in the region.

In 1355 the Queen, Helvig of Schleswig, consort of King Valdemar IV of Denmark (Valdemar Atterdag), became a lay sister at Esrum after being supplanted by King Valdemar's mistress, Tove. The queen was buried in the abbey church, which brought royal gifts of property for the abbey. Her daughter, Margaret I of Denmark, continued Esrum's royal patronage, which attracted increased benefactions from other noble families on Zealand.

Codex Esromensis 

A transcript of a collection of papers of the abbey between 1374 and 1497, consisting mostly of letters, has been preserved in Det Kongelige Bibliotek as the "Codex Esromensis".

Dissolution and after 
It was allowed to continue to function as a monastery until 1559, when the remaining 11 monks and the abbot were despatched to Sorø Abbey. The buildings at Esrum were then largely dismantled for building materials, apparently for use at Kronborg Castle to which the abbey estate was given.

In the 17th century the remaining structures were converted into a hunting lodge for the king and his courtiers, and the site was also used as a stud farm until 1717, after which it became a barracks for dragoons until 1746. From then on the buildings were used for a variety of military and civil administrative offices, becoming the property of the local government administration of Frederiksborg Amt.

During World War II the site was temporarily taken over as secure storage for the Danish National Archives, and immediately after the war was used for the accommodation of Latvian refugees.

Present-day 
The site and structures were thoroughly restored in 1996. The surviving buildings – the south wing of the conventual buildings and a watermill – have received protected status as a national historic monument and are now used as a museum and a school for the study of nature and the environment. A number of other leisure facilities and activities are also provided, including medieval re-enactments.

Legends 

A number of legends survive concerning the abbey.  One, about Brother Daniel, a monk at Esrum, illustrates the connection between religious houses. Brother Daniel fell ill and sent word to Abbot Vilhelm of Æbelholt Abbey. Abbot Vilhelm laid his hand upon Daniel and told him to drink from the sacred spring at Esrum by which Daniel was healed. Thereafter the spring was believed to have healing power, especially for gout, rashes, and headaches.

Another well-known legend from Esrum is the story of Brother Rus. One day a wanderer knocked at the abbey's door and having no work offered his services to the abbot. A place was found for him in the kitchen as the kitchen master's helper. Brother Rus was clever and learned his duties quickly and was praised by the other monks for his diligence. Even the abbot came to hear of Brother Rus's efforts.

However, Brother Rus was an ambitious young man and came up with a plan to advance himself. The opportunity came one day when he found himself alone with the kitchen master, whom he struck so hard that he broke his skull. After making sure the kitchen master was dead, Brother Rus ran out to the other monks calling for help because his master had been injured. The monks hurried to the kitchen and found that the kitchen master was dead.  Not knowing that Brother Rus had any responsibility, the abbot appointed him as the new master of the kitchen. The monks were so pleased at his good food that they suggested he become one of them, which he did.

Brother Rus hit upon other ways to ingratiate himself with the monks. He persuaded a local woman to enter the monastery to tempt the brothers into carnal sin, but the abbot discovered the woman and ordered her out of the abbey. Because of the monk's hood, she was unable to identify the brother who had invited her.

Brother Rus then decided to tempt the brothers into eating meat, which they never did. One day he went into the forest and came upon a cow. Since no one was in sight, he slaughtered it and took a hind quarter back to the kitchen which he soon cooked up for supper, hiding the rest in the woods. The monks enjoyed the meat so much that they asked for more.  Brother Rus willingly obliged. The poor peasant whose cow it had been had found the place of slaughter and hid himself, to discover who the thief might be, and presently he saw Brother Rus meet with several other devils and tell them of the evils he had done. The peasant ran straight to the abbot and told him what he had seen and heard. The abbot ordered Brother Rus confined and then turned over to the bailiff to be punished.  The brothers of Esrum Abbey repented and lived better lives thereafter.

Another story is that Esrum Abbey came into conflict with King Valdemar I, who, in order to complete the construction of Gurre Castle, supposedly forced the monks at Esrum to work as day labourers, much to the disgust of the abbot. When Valdemar died at Gurre Castle. God condemned him to hunt forever through the fields round about.

Cheese 
The cheese known as Esrum or Esrom is named after this monastery.

Notes and references

Other sources
Andreas Christian Anton Kierulf (1838) Esrom Klosters Historie (Kjøbenhavn, Reitzel)

External links 
 Esrum Kloster official website 
 Arkitekturguide.dk: Esrum kloster 
 Esrum Abbey - in: CISTOPEDIA - Encyclopædia Cisterciensis

Further reading 

 Hjortlund/Thomsen/Jørgensen, 1992: Esrum Kloster 
 Elverskov/Jørgensen, 1996: Den hellige jomfru i Esrum 

Benedictine monasteries in Denmark
Cistercian monasteries in Denmark
1151 establishments in Europe
1536 disestablishments in Denmark
Religious organizations established in the 1150s
Christian monasteries established in the 12th century
Listed buildings and structures in Gribskov Municipality
Museums in the Capital Region of Denmark
12th-century establishments in Denmark
Monasteries dissolved under the Danish Reformation